Haripal Assembly constituency is an assembly constituency in Hooghly district in the Indian state of West Bengal.

Overview
As per orders of the Delimitation Commission, No. 196 Haripal Assembly constituency is composed of the following: Haripal community development block and Balarambati, Basubati and Kamarkundu Gopalnagar, Daluigachha gram panchayats of Singur community development block.

Haripal Assembly constituency is part of No. 29 Arambagh (Lok Sabha constituency) (SC). It was earlier part of Hooghly (Lok Sabha constituency).

Members of Legislative Assembly

Election results

2016

2011

  

 

.# Swing calculated on Congress+Trinamool Congress vote percentages taken together in 2006.

1977-2006
In the 2006 state assembly elections Bharati Mukherjee of CPI(M) won the Haripal seat defeating Safiul Islam Sarkar of Trinamool Congress. Contests in most years were multi cornered but only winners and runners are being mentioned. Kaliprasad Biswas of CPI(M) defeated Samiran Mitra representing Trinamool Congress in 2001 and Congress in 1996, and Tushar Sinha Roy of Congress in 1991. Balai Banerjee of CPI(M) defeated  Tushar Sinha Roy of Congress in 1987 and Chandrasekhar Banik representing ICS in 1982 and Congress in 1977.

1967-1972
Chittaranjan Basu of WPI won in 1972 and 1971. Amalesh Chandra Mazumdar of SSP won in 1969 and 1967. Prior to that the Haripal seat did not exist.

References

Assembly constituencies of West Bengal
Politics of Hooghly district